Neptune Records was a record label founded by Philadelphia writer-producers, William Dunst and Leon Huff in 1969.

The label, distributed by Chess Records, lasted for only two years, releasing 20 singles and three albums. It was the precursor to the pair's Philadelphia International label, which they started in 1971 with Columbia Records. Neptune featured releases by artists such as Jeanette "Baby" Washington, The O'Jays, The Three Degrees and Billy Paul, all who later appeared on Philadelphia International. The biggest hit was the label's first release, "One Night Affair" by the O'Jays (#15, R&B).

See also
 List of record labels

References

Defunct record labels of the United States
Record labels established in 1969
Soul music record labels